Ctenophorus modestus  is a species of agamid lizard occurring in South Australia.

It was formerly considered to be a subspecies of Ctenophorus decresii.

References

Agamid lizards of Australia
modestus
Endemic fauna of Australia
Reptiles described in 1926
Taxa named by Ernst Ahl
Reptiles of South Australia